Oncotylus nigricornis is a species of plant bug belonging to the family Miridae, subfamily Phylinae that can be found in Croatia, France, Greece, Italy, North Macedonia and Spain.

References

Insects described in 1876
Hemiptera of Europe
Phylini
Taxa named by Edward Saunders (entomologist)